Now Kandeh (also Romanized as Naukandeh; also known as Naukandekh and Nowkandeh-ye Kūchek) is a village in Dinachal Rural District, Pareh Sar District, Rezvanshahr County, Gilan Province, Iran. In the 2006 census, its population was 1,071, in 293 families.

References 

Populated places in Rezvanshahr County